Edgar Jerónimo, best known as Stopirra (born December 25, 1978) is a retired Angolan football player. He has played for Angolan side Primeiro de Agosto as well as for the Angolan national team.

National team statistics

References

1978 births
Living people
Angolan footballers

Association football midfielders
Angola international footballers